Mattapax is a historic home located at Stevensville, Queen Anne's County, Maryland, United States. It  is a -story brick house, three bays wide, and one room deep, with flush brick chimneys at either end of a pitched gable roof built about 1760. In 1949 a restoration resulted in the construction of a brick wing to replace an earlier frame wing. Also on the property are a frame cottage, a large horse barn, and a frame wagon shed.

It was listed on the National Register of Historic Places in 1998.

References

External links
, including photo from 1998, at Maryland Historical Trust

Houses on the National Register of Historic Places in Maryland
Houses in Queen Anne's County, Maryland
Houses completed in 1760
Kent Island, Maryland
National Register of Historic Places in Queen Anne's County, Maryland